Frank E. Hill (1850 – March 29, 1906) served in the United States Army during the American Indian Wars. He received the Medal of Honor.

Hill was born in Mayfield, Wisconsin. He died on March 20, 1906, in Manhattan, Nevada. His ashes rest in the Columbarium of San Francisco in San Francisco, California.

Hill was severely wounded during an outbreak at Camp Date Creek, Arizona Territory on September 8, 1872; he later received a Medal of Honor for the incident.  He also received an honorable mention for his actions north of Baby Canyon on December 29, 1872.

Medal of Honor citation
His award citation reads:
Secured the person of a hostile Apache Chief, although while holding the chief he was severely wounded in the back by another Indian.

See also

 List of Medal of Honor recipients for the Indian Wars

References

External links
 

People from Polk, Wisconsin
Military personnel from Wisconsin
United States Army Medal of Honor recipients
United States Army soldiers
American military personnel of the Indian Wars
American Indian Wars recipients of the Medal of Honor
1850 births
1906 deaths